Jan Stráský's Cabinet was in power from 2 July 1992 to 31 December 1992. It was the last government of Czechoslovakia. It consisted of Civic Democratic Party, Movement for a Democratic Slovakia and Christian and Democratic Union – Czechoslovak People's Party. Leader of Civic Democratic Party Václav Klaus was originally authorised by President to form government. He instead decided to form Government of the Czech Republic.

Government ministers

References

Government of Czechoslovakia
Civic Democratic Party (Czech Republic)
KDU-ČSL